Robert Erlacher (born 16 September 1963) is an Italian former alpine skier.

Career
He won a race in World Cup and competed in the 1984 Winter Olympics.

References

External links
 
 

1963 births
Living people
Italian male alpine skiers
Olympic alpine skiers of Italy
Alpine skiers at the 1984 Winter Olympics
Germanophone Italian people
People from Corvara, South Tyrol
Sportspeople from Südtirol